Tetramorium is a genus of ants in the subfamily Myrmicinae that includes more than 520 species. These ants are also known as pavement ants.

Taxonomy and phylogeny 
Tetramorium was first described by Gustav Mayr in 1855 in the same publication as Monomorium.

Revision within the genus by Wagner et al. in 2017 recognized a complex of 10 cryptic species, 3 of which were raised from subspecies classifications and 2 of which were newly described. This revision also elevated the pavement ant introduced to North America as the species T. immigrans rather than the previous designation as a subspecies of T. caespitum. These 10 species within in the T. caespitum complex are as follows:
 Tetramorium alpestre Steiner, Schlick-Steiner & Seifert, 2010
 Tetramorium breviscapus Wagner et al., 2017
 Tetramorium caespitum  (Linnaeus, 1758)
 Tetramorium caucasicum Wagner et al., 2017
 Tetramorium fusciclava Consani & Zangheri, 1952
 Tetramorium hungaricum Röszler, 1935
 Tetramorium immigrans Santschi, 1927
 Tetramorium impurum (Foerster, 1850)
 Tetramorium indocile Santschi, 1927
 Tetramorium staerckei Kratochvíl, 1944

Description
Workers of most species have a ridged clypeus, an appendaged stinger, mandibles with 3 or 4 teeth, and antennae with 11 or 12 segments or with 3-segmented clubs on the tips. The genus is divided into several species groups defined by various characters.

Distribution
Most species are distributed throughout the Afrotropical and Oriental regions. Ten species have been recorded from Japan. One species of pavement ant, T. immigrans, is native to Europe and was probably introduced to North America starting in the 18th century.

Biology
Most known species nest in the soil, in decaying wood, or in leaf litter. Some live in trees or in termite nests.

Species

 Tetramorium aculeatum (Mayr, 1866)
 Tetramorium adelphon Bolton, 1979
 Tetramorium adpressum (Bolton, 1976)
 Tetramorium aegeum Radchenko, 1992
 Tetramorium africanum (Mayr, 1866)
 Tetramorium agile Arnold, 1960
 Tetramorium agnum (Santschi, 1935)
 Tetramorium akermani Arnold, 1926
 Tetramorium altivagans Santschi, 1914
 Tetramorium alpestre Steiner, Schlick-Steiner & Seifert, 2010
 Tetramorium amalae Sharaf & Aldawood, 2012
 Tetramorium amatongae Bolton, 1980
 Tetramorium amaurum Bolton, 1980
 Tetramorium amentete Bolton, 1980
 Tetramorium amissum Bolton, 1980
 Tetramorium amium Forel, 1912
 Tetramorium andrei Forel, 1892
 Tetramorium andrynicum Bolton, 1977
 Tetramorium angulinode Santschi, 1910
 Tetramorium anodontion Bolton, 1979
 Tetramorium antennatum (Mann, 1919)
 Tetramorium antipodum Wheeler, 1927
 Tetramorium antrema (Bolton, 1976)
 Tetramorium anxium Santschi, 1914
 Tetramorium aptum Bolton, 1977
 Tetramorium argenteopilosum Arnold, 1926
 Tetramorium armatum Santschi, 1927
 Tetramorium arnoldi (Forel, 1913)
 Tetramorium arzi Thome, 1969
 Tetramorium asetyum Bolton, 1980
 Tetramorium aspersum (Smith, 1865)
 Tetramorium ataxium Bolton, 1980
 Tetramorium avium Bolton, 1980
 Tetramorium banyulense Bernard, 1983
 Tetramorium barbigerum Bolton, 1980
 Tetramorium barryi Mathew, 1981
 Tetramorium basum Bolton, 1977
 Tetramorium baufra (Bolton, 1976)
 Tetramorium belgaense Forel, 1902
 Tetramorium bellicosum Bolton, 1980
 Tetramorium bequaerti Forel, 1913
 Tetramorium berbiculum Bolton, 1980
 Tetramorium bessonii Forel, 1891
 Tetramorium bevisi Arnold, 1958
 Tetramorium bicarinatum (Nylander, 1846)
 Tetramorium bicolor Viehmeyer, 1914
 Tetramorium biskrense Forel, 1904
 Tetramorium bothae Forel, 1910
 Tetramorium brevicorne Bondroit, 1918
 Tetramorium brevidentatum (Kutter, 1932)
 Tetramorium breviscapus Wagner et al., 2017
 Tetramorium brevispinosum (Stitz, 1910)
 Tetramorium browni Bolton, 1980
 Tetramorium bulawayense Forel, 1913
 Tetramorium bursakovi Radchenko, 1992
 Tetramorium buthrum Bolton, 1980
 Tetramorium caespitum (Linnaeus, 1758)
 Tetramorium caldarium (Roger, 1857)
 Tetramorium calidum Forel, 1907
 Tetramorium calinum Bolton, 1980
 Tetramorium camerunense Mayr, 1895
 Tetramorium candidum Bolton, 1980
 Tetramorium capense Mayr, 1865
 Tetramorium capillosum Bolton, 1980
 Tetramorium capitale (McAreavey, 1949)
 Tetramorium carinatum (Smith, 1859)
 Tetramorium caucasicum Wagner et al., 2017
 Tetramorium centum Bolton, 1977
 Tetramorium chapmani Bolton, 1977
 Tetramorium chefteki Forel, 1911
 Tetramorium chepocha (Bolton, 1976)
 Tetramorium chloe (Santschi, 1920)
 Tetramorium christiei Forel, 1902
 Tetramorium ciliatum Bolton, 1977
 Tetramorium clunum Forel, 1913
 Tetramorium cognatum Bolton, 1979
 Tetramorium coillum Bolton, 1979
 Tetramorium coloreum Mayr, 1901
 Tetramorium concaviceps Bursakov, 1984
 Tetramorium confine Radchenko & Arakelian, 1990
 Tetramorium confusum Bolton, 1977
 Tetramorium constanciae Arnold, 1917
 Tetramorium convexum Bolton, 1980
 Tetramorium coonoorense Forel, 1902
 Tetramorium crepum Wang & Wu, 1988
 Tetramorium cristatum Stitz, 1910
 Tetramorium crypticum (Bolton, 1976)
 Tetramorium cuneinode Bolton, 1977
 Tetramorium curtulum Emery, 1895
 Tetramorium curvispinosum Mayr, 1897
 Tetramorium cynicum Bolton, 1977
 Tetramorium davidi Forel, 1911
 Tetramorium decamerum (Forel, 1902)
 Tetramorium deceptum Bolton, 1977
 Tetramorium dedefra (Bolton, 1976)
 Tetramorium degener Santschi, 1911
 Tetramorium delagoense Forel, 1894
 Tetramorium densopilosum Radchenko & Arakelian, 1990
 Tetramorium depressiceps Menozzi, 1933
 Tetramorium desertorum (Forel, 1910)
 Tetramorium dichroum Santschi, 1932
 Tetramorium difficile Bolton, 1977
 Tetramorium diligens (Smith, 1865)
 Tetramorium diomandei Bolton, 1980
 Tetramorium distinctum (Bolton, 1976)
 Tetramorium do Forel, 1914
 Tetramorium dogieli Karavaiev, 1931
 Tetramorium dolichosum Bolton, 1980
 Tetramorium dominum Bolton, 1980
 Tetramorium doriae Emery, 1881
 Tetramorium dumezi Menozzi, 1942
 Tetramorium dysalum Bolton, 1979
 Tetramorium dysderke Bolton, 1980
 Tetramorium edouardi Forel, 1894
 Tetramorium eleates Forel, 1913
 Tetramorium electrum Bolton, 1979
 Tetramorium elidisum Bolton, 1980
 Tetramorium elisabethae Forel, 1904
 Tetramorium emeryi Mayr, 1901
 Tetramorium eminii (Forel, 1894)
 Tetramorium erectum Emery, 1895
 Tetramorium ericae Arnold, 1917
 Tetramorium etiolatum Bolton, 1977
 Tetramorium exasperatum Emery, 1891
 Tetramorium fergusoni Forel, 1902
 Tetramorium ferox Ruzsky, 1903
 Tetramorium feroxoide Dlussky & Zabelin, 1985
 Tetramorium fezzanense Bernard, 1948
 Tetramorium flabellum Bolton, 1980
 Tetramorium flagellatum Bolton, 1977
 Tetramorium flaviceps Arnold, 1960
 Tetramorium flavipes Emery, 1893
 Tetramorium flavithorax (Santschi, 1914)
 Tetramorium forte Forel, 1904
 Tetramorium frenchi Forel, 1914
 Tetramorium frigidum Arnold, 1926
 Tetramorium fulviceps (Emery, 1897)
 Tetramorium furtivum (Arnold, 1956)
 Tetramorium fusciclava Consani & Zangheri, 1952
 Tetramorium fuscipes (Viehmeyer, 1925)
 Tetramorium gabonense (Andre, 1892)
 Tetramorium galoasanum Santschi, 1910
 Tetramorium gambogecum (Donisthorpe, 1941)
 Tetramorium gazense Arnold, 1958
 Tetramorium gegaimi Forel, 1916
 Tetramorium geminatum Bolton, 1980
 Tetramorium gestroi (Menozzi, 1933)
 Tetramorium ghindanum Forel, 1910
 Tetramorium glabratum Stitz, 1923
 Tetramorium gladstonei Forel, 1913
 Tetramorium goniommoide Poldi, 1979
 Tetramorium gracile Forel, 1894
 Tetramorium grandinode Santschi, 1913
 Tetramorium granulatum Bolton, 1980
 Tetramorium grassii Emery, 1895
 Tetramorium guineense (Bernard, 1953)
 Tetramorium hapale Bolton, 1980
 Tetramorium hippocrate Agosti & Collingwood, 1987
 Tetramorium hispidum (Wheeler, 1915)
 Tetramorium hortorum Arnold, 1958
 Tetramorium humbloti Forel, 1891
 Tetramorium hungaricum Röszler, 1935
 Tetramorium ibycterum Bolton, 1979
 Tetramorium ictidum Bolton, 1980
 Tetramorium imbelle (Emery, 1915)
 Tetramorium immigrans Santschi, 1927
 Tetramorium impressum (Viehmeyer, 1925)
 Tetramorium impurum (Foerster, 1850)
 Tetramorium incruentatum Arnold, 1926
 Tetramorium indicum Forel, 1913
 Tetramorium indocile Santschi, 1927
 Tetramorium indosinense Wheeler, 1927
 Tetramorium inerme Mayr, 1877
 Tetramorium inezulae (Forel, 1914)
 Tetramorium infraspinosum Karavaiev, 1935
 Tetramorium infraspinum Forel, 1905
 Tetramorium inglebyi Forel, 1902
 Tetramorium insolens (Smith, 1861)
 Tetramorium intextum Santschi, 1914
 Tetramorium intonsum Bolton, 1980
 Tetramorium invictum Bolton, 1980
 Tetramorium isectum Bolton, 1979
 Tetramorium isipingense Forel, 1914
 Tetramorium jauresi Forel, 1914
 Tetramorium jejunum Arnold, 1926
 Tetramorium jiangxiense Wang & Xiao, 1988
 Tetramorium jizane Collingwood, 1985
 Tetramorium jordani Santschi, 1937
 Tetramorium juba Collingwood, 1985
 Tetramorium jugatum Bolton, 1980
 Tetramorium kabulistanicum Pisarski, 1967
 Tetramorium karakalense Dlussky & Zabelin, 1985
 Tetramorium katypum (Bolton, 1976)
 Tetramorium kelleri Forel, 1887
 Tetramorium kestrum Bolton, 1980
 Tetramorium kheperra (Bolton, 1976)
 Tetramorium khnum Bolton, 1977
 Tetramorium khyarum Bolton, 1980
 Tetramorium kisilkumense Dlussky, 1990
 Tetramorium kraepelini Forel, 1905
 Tetramorium krynitum Bolton, 1980
 Tetramorium kydelphon Bolton, 1979
 Tetramorium laevithorax Emery, 1895
 Tetramorium lanuginosum Mayr, 1870
 Tetramorium laparum Bolton, 1977
 Tetramorium laticephalum Bolton, 1977
 Tetramorium latreillei Forel, 1895
 Tetramorium legone Bolton, 1980
 Tetramorium lobulicorne Santschi, 1916
 Tetramorium longicorne Forel, 1907
 Tetramorium longoi Forel, 1915
 Tetramorium lucayanum Wheeler, 1905
 Tetramorium lucidulum Menozzi, 1933
 Tetramorium luteipes Santschi, 1910
 Tetramorium luteolum Arnold, 1926
 Tetramorium magnificum Bolton, 1980
 Tetramorium mai Wang, 1993
 Tetramorium manni Bolton, 1985
 Tetramorium marginatum Forel, 1895
 Tetramorium matopoense Arnold, 1926
 Tetramorium maurum Santschi, 1918
 Tetramorium mayri (Mann, 1919)
 Tetramorium megalops Bolton, 1977
 Tetramorium melanogyna Mann, 1919
 Tetramorium menkaura (Bolton, 1976)
 Tetramorium meressei Forel, 1916
 Tetramorium meridionale Emery, 1870
 Tetramorium meshena Bolton, 1976
 Tetramorium metactum Bolton, 1980
 Tetramorium mexicanum Bolton, 1979
 Tetramorium microgyna Santschi, 1918
 Tetramorium microps (Mayr, 1901)
 Tetramorium minimum (Bolton, 1976)
 Tetramorium minusculum (Santschi, 1914)
 Tetramorium miserabile Santschi, 1918
 Tetramorium mixtum Forel, 1902
 Tetramorium monardi (Santschi, 1937)
 Tetramorium mossamedense Forel, 1901
 Tetramorium muralti Forel, 1910
 Tetramorium muscorum Arnold, 1926
 Tetramorium mutatum Bolton, 1985
 Tetramorium myops Bolton, 1977
 Tetramorium nacta (Bolton, 1976)
 Tetramorium naganum Bolton, 1979
 Tetramorium nautarum Santschi, 1918
 Tetramorium navum Bolton, 1977
 Tetramorium nazgul Hita Garcia & Fisher, 2012
 Tetramorium nefassitense Forel, 1910
 Tetramorium nigrum Forel, 1907
 Tetramorium nipponense Wheeler, 1928
 Tetramorium nitidissimum Pisarski, 1967
 Tetramorium nodiferum (Emery, 1901)
 Tetramorium noratum Bolton, 1977
 Tetramorium notiale Bolton, 1980
 Tetramorium nube Weber, 1943
 Tetramorium nursei Bingham, 1903
 Tetramorium obesum Andre, 1887
 Tetramorium obtusidens Viehmeyer, 1916
 Tetramorium occidentale (Santschi, 1916)
 Tetramorium ocothrum Bolton, 1979
 Tetramorium oculatum Forel, 1913
 Tetramorium ornatum Emery, 1897
 Tetramorium osiris (Bolton, 1976)
 Tetramorium pacificum Mayr, 1870
 Tetramorium palaense Bolton, 1979
 Tetramorium parasiticum Bolton, 1980
 Tetramorium parvispinum (Emery, 1893)
 Tetramorium parvum Bolton, 1977
 Tetramorium pauper Forel, 1907
 Tetramorium peringueyi Arnold, 1926
 Tetramorium perlongum Santschi, 1923
 Tetramorium persignatum Bolton, 1995
 Tetramorium petersi Forel, 1910
 Tetramorium peutli Forel, 1916
 Tetramorium phasias Forel, 1914
 Tetramorium pialtum Bolton, 1980
 Tetramorium pilosum Emery, 1893
 Tetramorium pinnipilum Bolton, 1980
 Tetramorium placidum Bolton, 1979
 Tetramorium platynode Bolton, 1980
 Tetramorium pleganon Bolton, 1979
 Tetramorium plesiarum Bolton, 1979
 Tetramorium plumosum Bolton, 1980
 Tetramorium pnyxis Bolton, 1976
 Tetramorium pogonion Bolton, 1980
 Tetramorium politum Emery, 1897
 Tetramorium postpetiolatum Santschi, 1919
 Tetramorium poweri Forel, 1914
 Tetramorium praetextum Bolton, 1980
 Tetramorium proximum Bolton, 1979
 Tetramorium psymanum Bolton, 1980
 Tetramorium pulchellum Emery, 1897
 Tetramorium pulcherrimum (Donisthorpe, 1945)
 Tetramorium pullulum Santschi, 1924
 Tetramorium punctiventre Emery, 1887
 Tetramorium punicum (Smith, 1861)
 Tetramorium pusillum Emery, 1895
 Tetramorium pylacum Bolton, 1980
 Tetramorium pyrenaeicum Roeszler, 1937
 Tetramorium quadridentatum Stitz, 1910
 Tetramorium quadrispinosum Emery, 1886
 Tetramorium qualarum Bolton, 1980
 Tetramorium quasirum Bolton, 1979
 Tetramorium ranarum Forel, 1895
 Tetramorium regulare Bolton, 1980
 Tetramorium rekhefe Bolton, 1979
 Tetramorium repentinum Arnold, 1926
 Tetramorium repletum Wang & Xiao, 1988
 Tetramorium reptana Bolton, 1976
 Tetramorium reticuligerum Bursakov, 1984
 Tetramorium rhetidum Bolton, 1980
 Tetramorium rigidum Bolton, 1977
 Tetramorium rimytyum Bolton, 1980
 Tetramorium rinatum Bolton, 1977
 Tetramorium robustior Forel, 1892
 Tetramorium rogatum Bolton, 1980
 Tetramorium rossi (Bolton, 1976)
 Tetramorium rothschildi (Forel, 1907)
 Tetramorium rotundatum (Santschi, 1924)
 Tetramorium rufescens (Stitz, 1923)
 Tetramorium rugigaster Bolton, 1977
 Tetramorium ruginode Stitz, 1917
 Tetramorium saginatum Bolton, 1980
 Tetramorium sahlbergi Finzi, 1936
 Tetramorium salomo Mann, 1919
 Tetramorium salvatum Forel, 1902
 Tetramorium scabrosum (Smith, 1859)
 Tetramorium schaufussii Forel, 1891
 Tetramorium schmidti Forel, 1904
 Tetramorium schneideri Emery, 1898
 Tetramorium schoutedeni Santschi, 1924
 Tetramorium sculptatum Bolton, 1977
 Tetramorium scytalum Bolton, 1979
 Tetramorium semilaeve Andre, 1883
 Tetramorium semireticulatum Arnold, 1917
 Tetramorium seneb Bolton, 1977
 Tetramorium sepositum Santschi, 1918
 Tetramorium sepultum Bolton, 1980
 Tetramorium sericeiventre Emery, 1877
 Tetramorium sericeum Arnold, 1926
 Tetramorium setigerum Mayr, 1901
 Tetramorium setuliferum Emery, 1895
 Tetramorium severini (Emery, 1895)
 Tetramorium shensiense Bolton, 1977
 Tetramorium shilohense Forel, 1913
 Tetramorium sigillum Bolton, 1980
 Tetramorium signatum Emery, 1895
 Tetramorium sikorae Forel, 1892
 Tetramorium simillimum (Smith, 1851)
 Tetramorium simulator Arnold, 1917
 Tetramorium sitefrum Bolton, 1980
 Tetramorium sjostedti Forel, 1915
 Tetramorium smaug Hita Garcia & Fisher, 2012
 Tetramorium smithi Mayr, 1879
 Tetramorium solidum Emery, 1886
 Tetramorium somniculosum Arnold, 1926
 Tetramorium spininode Bolton, 1977
 Tetramorium spinosum (Pergande, 1896)
 Tetramorium splendens Ruzsky, 1902
 Tetramorium splendidior (Viehmeyer, 1925)
 Tetramorium squaminode Santschi, 1911
 Tetramorium staerckei Kratochvíl, 1944
 Tetramorium steinheili Forel, 1892
 Tetramorium striativentre Mayr, 1877
 Tetramorium strictum Bolton, 1977
 Tetramorium striolatum Viehmeyer, 1914
 Tetramorium subcoecum Forel, 1907
 Tetramorium sudanense (Weber, 1943)
 Tetramorium surrogatum Bolton, 1985
 Tetramorium syriacum Emery, 1922
 Tetramorium tabarum Bolton, 1980
 Tetramorium talpa (Bolton, 1976)
 Tetramorium tanakai Bolton, 1977
 Tetramorium tantillum Bolton, 1979
 Tetramorium taueret Bolton, 1995
 Tetramorium taylori Bolton, 1985
 Tetramorium tenebrosum Arnold, 1926
 Tetramorium tenuicrine (Emery, 1914)
 Tetramorium termitobium Emery, 1908
 Tetramorium tersum Santschi, 1911
 Tetramorium thalidum Bolton, 1977
 Tetramorium thoth (Bolton, 1976)
 Tetramorium titus Forel, 1910
 Tetramorium tonganum Mayr, 1870
 Tetramorium tortuosum Roger, 1863
 Tetramorium tosii Emery, 1899
 Tetramorium traegaordhi Santschi, 1914
 Tetramorium transversarium Roger, 1863
 Tetramorium tricarinatum Viehmeyer, 1914
 Tetramorium trimeni (Emery, 1895)
 Tetramorium tsushimae Emery, 1925
 Tetramorium turcomanicum Santschi, 1921
 Tetramorium turneri Forel, 1902
 Tetramorium tychadion Bolton, 1980
 Tetramorium tylinum Bolton, 1977
 Tetramorium typhlops Bolton, 1980
 Tetramorium ubangense Santschi, 1937
 Tetramorium umtaliense Arnold, 1926
 Tetramorium unicum Bolton, 1980
 Tetramorium urbanii Bolton, 1977
 Tetramorium validiusculum Emery, 1897
 Tetramorium vandalum Bolton, 1977
 Tetramorium vernicosum Radchenko, 1992
 Tetramorium versiculum Bolton, 1980
 Tetramorium vertigum Bolton, 1977
 Tetramorium vexator Arnold, 1926
 Tetramorium viehmeyeri Forel, 1907
 Tetramorium viticola Weber, 1943
 Tetramorium vombis (Bolton, 1976)
 Tetramorium wadje Bolton, 1980
 Tetramorium wagneri Viehmeyer, 1914
 Tetramorium walshi (Forel, 1890)
 Tetramorium warreni Arnold, 1926
 Tetramorium weitzeckeri Emery, 1895
 Tetramorium xanthogaster Santschi, 1911
 Tetramorium xuthum Bolton, 1980
 Tetramorium yarthiellum Bolton, 1976
 Tetramorium yerburyi Forel, 1902
 Tetramorium youngi Bolton, 1980
 Tetramorium zahrae Santschi, 1923
 Tetramorium zambezium Santschi, 1939
 Tetramorium zapyrum Bolton, 1980
 Tetramorium zenatum Bolton, 1979
 Tetramorium zonacaciae (Weber, 1943)
 Tetramorium zypidum Bolton, 1977

Gallery

References

External links
 Japanese Ant Image Database: Genus Tetramorium
 AntWeb: Pictures of some Tetramorium species

Further reading
Garcia, F. H. and B. L. Fisher. (2012). The ant genus Tetramorium Mayr (Hymenoptera: Formicidae) in the Malagasy region—taxonomy of the T. bessonii, T. bonibony, T. dysalum, T. marginatum, T. tsingy, and T. weitzeckeri species groups. Zootaxa 3365.

 
Ant genera
Taxa named by Gustav Mayr
Taxonomy articles created by Polbot